Underground most commonly refers to:
 Subterranea (geography), the regions beneath the surface of the Earth

Underground may also refer to:

Places
 The Underground (Boston), a music club in the Allston neighborhood of Boston
 The Underground (Stoke concert venue), a club/music venue based in Hanley, Stoke-on-Trent
 Underground Atlanta, a shopping and entertainment district in the Five Points neighborhood of downtown Atlanta, Georgia
 Buenos Aires Underground, a rapid transit system
 London Underground, a rapid transit system

Arts, entertainment, and media

Films
 Underground (1928 film), a drama by Anthony Asquith
 Underground (1941 film), a war drama by Vincent Sherman
 Underground (1970 film), a war drama starring Robert Goulet
 Underground (1976 film), a documentary about the radical organization the Weathermen
 Underground (1989 film), a film featuring Melora Walters
 Underground (1995 film), a film by Emir Kusturica
 The Underground (1997 film), a cop must stop the killings of rap stars
 Underground (2007 film), a British independent film starring Mark Strange
 Underground (2011 film), a horror film starring Adrian R'Mante
 Underground (2020 film), a/k/a Souterrain, a drama film directed by Sophie Dupuis
 Underground: The Julian Assange Story, a 2012 Australian television film on Julian Assange for Network Ten

Games
 Underground (role-playing game), a satirical superhero game
 Underground, an expansion pack for Tom Clancy's The Division
 Medal of Honor: Underground, a 2000 first-person shooter
 Need for Speed: Underground, a 2003 racing video game
 Need for Speed: Underground 2, a 2004 racing video game
 Tony Hawk's Underground, a 2003 skateboarding video game
 Tony Hawk's Underground 2, a 2004 skateboarding video game
 Underground Zone, the first level in Sonic the Hedgehog 2 (8-bit)

Literature
 Underground (Dreyfus book), a 1997 nonfiction book about computer hacking
 Underground (McGahan novel), by Andrew McGahan
 Underground (Murakami book), a 1998 collection of interviews about the Tokyo sarin gas attack
 The Underground (Animorphs), by K. A. Applegate
 The Underground (Left Behind: The Kids), by Jerry B. Jenkins and Tim LaHaye
 Underground comix

Music

Albums 
 Underground (The Electric Prunes album), 1967
 Underground (Thelonious Monk album), 1968
 Memphis Underground, Herbie Mann album, 1968
 Underground (Twinkle Brothers album), 
 Underground (Phil Keaggy album), 1983
 Underground (Graham Bonnet album), 1997
 Underground (Jayo Felony album), 1999
 Underground (Courtney Pine album), 1997
 Underground (Chris Potter album), 2006
 Underground (soundtrack), by Goran Bregović, 2000
 Underground, by Analog Pussy, 
 Underground Vol. 1: 1991–1994, a compilation album by Three 6 Mafia, 1999
 Underground Vol. 2: Club Memphis, a compilation album by Three 6 Mafia, 1999

Songs 
 "Underground", a song by Curtis Mayfield from Roots, 1970
 "Underground", a song by Gentle Giant from Civilian
 "Underground", a song by Tom Waits from Swordfishtrombones
 "Underground", song by Men at Work from Business as Usual, 1980s
 "Underground" (David Bowie song), featured in the film Labyrinth
 "Underground" (Ben Folds Five song), 1995
 "Underground" (Evermore song), 2010
 "Underground", a song by Adam Lambert from The Original High, 2015
 "Underground", a song by Circa Zero from Circus Hero
 "Underground", a song by Decadence from Undergrounder, 2017
 "Underground", a song by Eminem from Relapse
 "Underground", a song by Jane's Addiction from The Great Escape Artist
 "Underground", a song by Pokey LaFarge from Something In The Water
 "Underground", a song by The Tea Party from Triptych
 "The Underground", a song by Mani Spinx

Other uses in music
 Underground music, a variety of music subgenres

Television
 Underground (TV series), a 2016 American television drama series
 TCM Underground, a weekly cult-film showcase
 The Underground (TV series), a sketch comedy show
 "Underground" (1958 TV play), a British television drama, part of Armchair Theatre
 "Underground" (Stargate Atlantis), an episode of Stargate Atlantis
 "Underground" (BoJack Horseman), an episode of BoJack Horseman
 "Underground", a Transformers: Armada episode

Other uses in arts, entertainment, and media
 Underground (play), by Michael Sloane
 Underground press, independent counterculture publications
 Underground producciones, an Argentine producer of TV series
 The Underground, a satirical student newspaper at the University of British Columbia

Groups and organizations
 Narodnaya Volya, an underground group in late 19th-century Russia
 Resistance movement
 Resistance during World War II, with some groups sometimes referred to informally as "The Underground"
 Polish Underground State, 1939-1945
 Weather Underground, a clandestine far-left terrorist group which operated in the United States of America between 1969 and 1977

Other uses
 UK underground, a counter-cultural movement in the United Kingdom
 Underground city, a series of linked subterranean spaces
 Underground economy, a market system operating outside of legal regulations
 Underground City, Montreal
 Underground living, refers simply to living below the ground's surface
 Underground mining (hard rock), removal of valuable minerals from below the Earth's surface
 Underground Railroad, an informal network of secret routes and safe houses
 The Underground (roller coaster), a wooden roller coaster at Adventureland (Iowa)

See also
 Rapid transit, rail-based transportation systems, which often operate in tunnels
 Underground culture (disambiguation)
 Underground 2 (disambiguation)
 6 Underground (disambiguation)
 Overground (disambiguation)